Elenitza Canavati Hadjopulos (born December 20, 1972 in Monterrey, Nuevo León, Mexico) is a Mexican politician and graduate in International Relations. She was the State Director of DIF Nuevo León.

Education and personal life 
She is the daughter of Ricardo Canavati Tafich. She received a Bachelor in International Relations from the Iberoamericana University, where she graduated with honors.

Partisan Activity 
During the year 2000 she was Coordinator of Youth Groups in Francisco Labastida Ochoa’s, the Institutional Revolutionary Party’s candidate for the Presidential Campaign in Nuevo León. In 2001, she was Deputy Secretary General of the Institutional Revolutionary Party’s Young Women's Front and since then has held the position of National Councillor of Colosio Foundation.

Professional career

Non profit organizations 
In Fundación Unidos, AC she served as Volunteer Coordinator in 1999 and 2007 as Director of institutional Relations. In 1995 she served as Special Events Coordinator at UNICEF Mexico.

Public Organisms 
From October 2003 to May 2011, she worked as Family's Integral Development (DIF) Director in the state of Nuevo León. Within this same system, she had previously served as Deputy Director and Volunteer Coordinator from 2003 until 2006.

Elected Office

City of Monterrey 

In 2009 was Councilwoman of Monterrey, Nuevo León.

References

External links
 Eleni Canavati official site

1972 births
Institutional Revolutionary Party politicians
Living people
Mexican people of Lebanese descent
Mexican people of Greek descent
People from Monterrey